Pompiliu Iordache (18 October 1954 – 23 October 2006) was a Romanian football forward. He opened the score in the 3–2 victory from the 1982 Cupa României Final against FC Baia Mare, helping Dinamo București win the forth cup in the club's history.

International career
Pompiliu Iordache played two friendly games at international level for Romania making his debut under coach Mircea Lucescu in a 1–1 against Turkey. The second game was a 3–1 away victory against Greece, when he came as a substitute and replaced Romulus Gabor in the 57th minute.

Honours
Dinamo București
Divizia A: 1981–82, 1982–83
Cupa României: 1981–82
Victoria București
Divizia B: 1984–85

Notes

References

1954 births
2006 deaths
Romanian footballers
Romania international footballers
Association football forwards
Liga I players
Liga II players
CSM Focșani players
FC Dinamo București players
FC Olt Scornicești players
Victoria București players
FC Petrolul Ploiești players
People from Râmnicu Sărat